Janet Ely (later Lagourgue and Thorburn, born September 12, 1953) is a retired American female diver. She competed at the 1972 and 1976 Olympics and finished fourth in 1972, both in the 3 m springboard and 10 m platform. In 1975 she won the world title in the platform and placed second at the Pan American Games. Domestically Ely held the AAU platform titles in 1972 and 1975.

Early life
Ely attended Sandia Preparatory School in Albuquerque in New Mexico She left Albuquerque in 10th grade to go and live with her coach Dick Kimball, where she learned to swim and dive at the YMCA Tennis Club. She was introduced to her coach by "a little Japanese lady", who invited Ely to join her at a swimming camp in Florida and after a two-week stay, she was invited by Kimball to train with him for a year.

She graduated from the University of Michigan in 1972, and later coached divers at the Mission Viejo Nadadores.

Career
In April 1971, Ely competed in the Hall of Fame International Diving Championships, where she surprised spectators in her performance by outscoring Czechoslovakia's 1968 Summer Olympics gold-medalist Milena Duchková in the 10-meter platform event, with a score of 366.75 to 356.80.

Ely competed in the 1972 Summer Olympics diving events, having won the 10-meter event during the United States Olympic trials in July, to secure her place on the diving team along with Cindy Potter and Micki King. Upon initially arriving, Ely noted that she "had a really good feeling" and made friends with others on the U.S diving team, with an open atmosphere in the period before the competition began. Less than an hour she was scheduled to start her dives, her team coach was advised that unless Ely submitted to an immediate femininity test, she would be disqualified. Ely recalled the experience as being "really frightening" as "they were all talking German and laughing". Despite initially feeling optimistic, Ely finished 4th in both the 3-meter springboard and 10-meter platform diving events. Although missing out on a medal, she "really enjoyed it over-all" but was critical about the politics of the event, suggesting that competition between countries appeared to be more important than between athletes. The experience left her disillusioned and at the time, she was not sure if she would want to compete at the next Olympics in 1976. During the event, Ely was struggling with back problems which she had corrected shortly afterwards in Puerto Rico.

During the 1975 World Aquatics Championships, she won a gold medal in the women's 10m platform and later in the 1975 Pan American Games, won a silver medal in the women's 10m platform event. Ely's silver-medal finish was considered an upset, as she was expected to win gold on the basis of being the 10-meter platform world champion, but ultimately congratulated Canada's Janet Nutter on her victory.

In June 1976, she secured her position on the 1976 Summer Olympics team after "eight spectacular dives", scoring 438.96 points with no single dive being scored less than 8/10 by judges.

Personal life
Ely was married twice. In November 1978, she married John Thorburn in Dallas, Texas. Her father was D. Maxwell Ellett and she has two brothers, of which one, Teddy, is a twin.

References

1953 births
American female divers
Living people
Divers at the 1972 Summer Olympics
Divers at the 1976 Summer Olympics
Olympic divers of the United States
Sportspeople from Albuquerque, New Mexico
World Aquatics Championships medalists in diving
Pan American Games silver medalists for the United States
Pan American Games medalists in diving
Divers at the 1975 Pan American Games
Michigan Wolverines women's divers
Medalists at the 1975 Pan American Games